Annunciation Monastery may refer to:

 Annunciation Monastery (Tolyatti), a Russian church complex
 Annunciation Monastery, Albania
 Annunciation Monastery, Čačak, a Serbian Monument of Culture of Great Importance
 Annunciation Monastery (University of Mary), a Benedictine religious community in Bismarck, North Dakota